Karl Alexander, 5th Prince of Thurn and Taxis, full German name: Karl Alexander Fürst von Thurn und Taxis (22 February 1770 – 15 July 1827) was the fifth Prince of Thurn and Taxis, head of the Thurn-und-Taxis-Post, and Head of the Princely House of Thurn and Taxis from 13 November 1805 until his death on 15 July 1827. With the death of his father on 13 November 1805, he became nominal Generalpostmeister of the Imperial Reichspost until the resignation of Francis II, Holy Roman Emperor.

Early life 
Karl Alexander was born as the son of Karl Anselm, 4th Prince of Thurn and Taxis and his first wife, Duchess Auguste of Württemberg. He studied at the Universities of Strasbourg, Würzburg, and Mainz and then subsequently went on a European tour. In 1797, he was appointed successor to his ailing father's position as Prinzipalkommissar at the Perpetual Imperial Diet in Regensburg. Karl Alexander also worked for the Thurn and Taxis postal empire, operating during a decline due to the gradual loss of territory as a result of the Napoleonic Wars.

Marriage and family 
Karl Alexander married Duchess Therese of Mecklenburg-Strelitz, fourth eldest child and third eldest daughter of Charles II, Grand Duke of Mecklenburg and his wife Princess Friederike of Hesse-Darmstadt, on 25 May 1789 in Neustrelitz, Mecklenburg-Strelitz. Karl Alexander and Therese had seven children:

Princess Charlotte Luise of Thurn and Taxis (24 March 1790 – 22 October 1790)
Prince George Karl of Thurn and Taxis (26 March 1792 – 20 January 1795)
Princess Maria Theresia of Thurn and Taxis (6 July 1794 – 18 August 1874), ancestress of Gloria, Princess of Thurn and Taxis
Princess Luise Friederike of Thurn and Taxis (29 August 1798 – 1 December 1798)
Princess Maria Sophia Dorothea of Thurn and Taxis (4 March 1800 – 20 December 1870)
Maximilian Karl, 6th Prince of Thurn and Taxis (3 November 1802 – 10 November 1871)
Prince Friedrich Wilhelm of Thurn and Taxis (29 January 1805 – 7 September 1825)

Continuation of the post

After the end of the Holy Roman Empire, the Thurn and Taxis postal system continued to survive as a private company. Since 1806, Karl Alexander headed a private postal company, the Thurn-und-Taxis-Post. It existed first as a feud of some of the Confederation of the Rhine members, such as Baden, Bavaria, and Württemberg. Bavaria, however, nationalized the postal system two years later. After the Congress of Vienna, Karl Alexander took over the Hessian and Thuringian postal services, as well as those in the Hanseatic League cities of Bremen, Hamburg, and Lübeck, and Schaffhausen. From 1820, the company began to prosper again, so Karl Alexander began to acquire large amounts of land holdings.

Acquisition of new land
According to the Confederation of the Rhine Act, agreed upon between Napoleon I of France and the Confederation of the Rhine princes, the Principality of Thurn and Taxis lost its independence and was mediatised in 1806. Since then, the Princes of Thurn and Taxis and hence Karl Alexander, depending on the territory, were subjects of either the King of Württemberg, or the Princes of Hohenzollern-Sigmaringen. In return, the House of Thurn and Taxis received the Imperial Abbey of St. Emmeram and associated territories in Regensburg. Karl Alexander also received as the family head of the House of Thurn and Taxis, Prussian possessions in the Grand Duchy of Poland. In 1822/23, he bought from the Count Kinsky and others the Burg Richenburg in Liberec Bohemia.

Ancestry

References

 Wolfgang Behringer: Thurn und Taxis, München 1990 
 Wolfgang Behringer: Im Zeichen des Merkur, Göttingen 2003 
 Wolfgang Behringer: Innovative Reichsfürsten, in: Damals, Juli 2005
 Martin Dallmeier: Quellen zur Geschichte des europäischen Postwesens, Lassleben, Kallmünz 1977
 Ludwig Kalmus: Weltgeschichte der Post, Wien 1937
 Max Piendl: Das fürstliche Haus Thurn und Taxis, Regensburg 1980
 Europäische Stammtafeln Band V, Genealogie Thurn und Taxis, Tafel 131
 Eugen Lennhoff/Oskar Posner: Internationales Freimaurer-Lexikon. Wien 1932, Nachdruck: Almathea-Verlag München 1980

External links

|- 
! colspan="3" style="background: #bebebe; color: #000000" | Postal offices

1770 births
1827 deaths
Hereditary Princes of Thurn and Taxis
German landowners
People from Regensburg
German Roman Catholics
Members of the Bavarian Reichsrat
Knights of the Golden Fleece of Austria
Members of the Württembergian Chamber of Lords
Burials at the Gruftkapelle, St. Emmeram's Abbey